Tomb KV14 is a joint tomb, used originally by Twosret and then reused and extended by Setnakhte. It has been open since antiquity, but was not properly recorded until Hartwig Altenmüller excavated it from 1983 to 1987.

Located in the main body of the Valley of the Kings, it has two burial chambers, the later extensions making the tomb one of the largest of the Royal Tombs, at over 112 metres long.

The original decoration showing the female Twosret was replaced with those of the male Setnakhte.

References
Reeves, N & Wilkinson, R.H. The Complete Valley of the Kings, 1996, Thames and Hudson, London
Siliotti, A. Guide to the Valley of the Kings and to the Theban Necropolises and Temples, 1996, A.A. Gaddis, Cairo

External links
Theban Mapping Project: KV14 includes description, images, and plans of the tomb.

Buildings and structures completed in the 12th century BC
Valley of the Kings